Michael Jansson is an economist and the Edward G. and Nancy S. Jordan Family professor at the University of California, Berkeley.

Jansson is an associate editor with Econometrica and a co-editor of Econometric Theory and The Econometrics Journal.

Jansson was a Sloan Fellow from 2007 to 2009. Jansson was a Fulbright Scholar from 1996 to 1997.

References

Living people
University of California, Berkeley College of Letters and Science faculty
Danish economists
Aarhus University alumni
Sloan Fellows
Year of birth missing (living people)